Sigma Alpha Rho is the oldest continuously run, independent Jewish high school fraternity, founded on November 18, 1917, by 11 young men in West Philadelphia, Pennsylvania.

This Jewish High School Fraternity has international, regional and local organization, all of which have covered areas from New Orleans, Louisiana, United States of America to Montreal, Quebec, Canada and from Atlantic City, New Jersey, USA to North Hollywood, California, USA.

The fraternity emphasizes independence as brothers organize and run any event they wish in order to develop leadership and planning skills for later in life and enjoy themselves as much as possible.

History

1917–1930
From 1931 History of SAR
On November 18, 1917, 11 young men gathered in a synagogue on Larchwood Avenue, near 60th Street, in Philadelphia for a meeting of the Soathical Club. The Soathical Club was an organization that had been established the previous Spring by a group of Jewish students in the West Philadelphia High School for the purpose of banding them together socially. The name was derived from a combination of the words social and athletic, and among the activities was included a baseball team.

At the meeting, Bill Braude proposed that the Club be formed into a fraternity, primarily for the advancement of Jewish student interests in the West Philadelphia High School.

One of the first matters adopted by the new Fraternity was the selection of a pin which would certify and symbolize brotherhood. Brother Alexander Meisel was entrusted with this work, and after much deliberation he presented the design—The Gleaming Eye.

The second matter considered by the new Fraternity was the selection of their colors, Royal Purple and White.

Jules Feinstein was elected as President of the Fraternity, still a one chapter organization. Louis Marios was elected as Vice President, Nathan Goldman became Secretary, Benjamin Landau assumed the role of Treasurer, and Harry Katz took the position of Financial Secretary.

In the Spring of 1918, the first affair ever given under the auspices of the Sigma Alpha Rho Fraternity was held. At that affair, a number of new men were introduced, some of them such as Jerry Abramson and John Borska, brothers who were to exercise a powerful influence on the development of Sigma Alpha Rho. By the Fall of the year, Jerry Abramson had become the leader of the group, and he was elected as President to succeed Jules Feinstein.

Under his capable leadership, Sigma Alpha Rho forged rapidly ahead as it began to exert a potent force in the activities of the West Philadelphia High School.

Through its many years of existence this group accomplished many things of social and fraternal merit. The group decided that an expansion by the establishing chapters in other high schools would let other Jewish youth experience those same things. This action formed the basis of the National Organizers Department, the precursor to the present day Supreme Board of Chancellors (see "Governing Body" below).

June 10, 1921, marked the momentous occasion of taking the second chapter into the Sigma Alpha Rho Fraternity. In preparation for this expansion, the fraternal and ritual minded members of the group polished, revamped, and rewrote the rituals and rites of Sigma Alpha Rho, until finally they assumed the proportions and composition that exist today. Thus, the Sigma Chapter was introduced, and with a designation as a Sigma Chapter came the appellation of the Phi Chapter to the original body, and SAR became an institution rather than a group.

On the evening of June 10, on the Roof Garden of the Lorraine Hotel, ten members of the Central High School of Philadelphia were solemnly ushered in and formally constituted as The Sigma Chapter, under the newly revised rituals.

One by one every high school in Philadelphia was drawn into the bounds of the fraternity. Reaching out in a broad fan-like swoop, the Fraternity drew into its fold successively chapters in Camden, New Jersey, Wilmington, Delaware, New York, New York, and Pittsburgh, Pennsylvania. But with this expansion came a problem which was vital – the need of a central governing body was recognized; a body which would serve as a connecting link for all chapters no matter how widely they were distributed.

National Organization
An Executive Council was created to handle the day to day problems of the organization in September 1921. This Council at first had eight members, four from the Phi Chapter (West Philadelphia) and four from the Sigma Chapter (Central High School of Philadelphia). Brothers Rosenthal, Abramson, Segal and Herman representing Phi and Horowitz, Good, Buten and Hoffman, members of Sigma.

This Council set up the first plans for the conduct of the National Organization, and today the complex system of constitution and by-laws that the fraternity follows still hearkens back to the original fundamental laid down by those eight men. They selected the name Supreme Exalted Ruler for the National President as well as the other national officers, and at their first meeting made the following elections: Supreme Exalted Ruler (President), Leon S. Rosenthal; Exalted Mortal Ruler (Vice-President), Walter Greenspan Horowitz; Supreme Exchequer (Treasurer), Alexander David Segal; Supreme Scribe (Secretary), Philip Joseph Heiman. These men were the first national officers of the Fraternity. This Council served as the bond which wove the different Philadelphia chapters into a much stronger association and relationship.

In the beginning the Council possessed very limited powers and few duties, but with the advent of distant Chapters such as Newark, New Jersey, and Pittsburgh, Pennsylvania, it became necessary to form a governing council which would include their representation. Obviously the Executive Council had served its purpose, and so, on January 20, 1924, the Supreme Exalted Ruler dissolved the Executive Council, and a few moments later called into session the National Executive Council representing every Chapter in the Fraternity. New elections were held and Leon S. Rosenthal was again elected as Supreme Exalted Ruler. A new Constitution, which was drawn up by the Constitutional Revision Committee under Brother Rosenthal's leadership, was formally approved by the delegates in session and adopted as the new constitution of Sigma Alpha Rho.

In the Conventions that subsequently followed as yearly events, meetings of the National Executive Council became more and more complex; Delegates from every chapter were given the opportunity of expressing themselves and introducing resolutions.

When the 1926 Convention rolled around, certain notable changes were made in the National Organization. Amendments to the Constitution provided for a new governing body, one with greater power and resources. This body, the Supreme Board of Chancellors, included the Supreme Exalted Ruler, Supreme Mortal Ruler, Exalted Mortal Ruler, Supreme Exchequer, Supreme Scribe, and the preceding Supreme Exalted Ruler plus three Chancellors, and was to be elected annually by the National Executive Council (Delegates from each Chapter).

The duties of this Board were to execute all rulings and decisions approved by the National Executive Council; to be the final body of interpretation for both the ritual and the Constitution; to enforce all the decisions of the Supreme Exalted Ruler; to hear all appeals and to decide whatever fraternal matters which might be forwarded to them by any chapter.

The Board was to meet at least twice a year upon a ten-day notice to each member. Upon the discretion of the Supreme Exalted Ruler, the Board was to meet whenever it was deemed necessary to transact any business pertaining to the National Organization. All expenses incurred by the Chancellors in attending these sessions were to be paid by the National Treasury.

Each member of the board may cast one vote on any matter under the consideration of the Board. When a majority of those present voted in a certain way, the resolution was to be regarded as passed. The Board of Chancellors was also given the power to subpoena any brother and direct him to appear before one of its meetings to be questioned. All attendance of non-members at these meetings was to be by courtesy of the Supreme Board of Chancellors. Appeals from the decisions of this Board could only be taken to the National Executive Council in session. The Constitution also empowers the Board of Chancellors to unset any officer in the fraternity who has been proved to be incompetent; to declare any chapter inactive; to declare any member of the fraternity inactive or suspended after a fair and impartial hearing.

On December 26, 1926, the first meetings of the Supreme Board of Chancellors, which was composed of Brothers Good, Weiss, Savitch, Cantor, Rosenbloom, Rosenthal, and Goldhaber were held at the Astor Hotel in New York City. These meetings which were called to order by Supreme Exalted Ruler Good, included the enactment of a series of by-laws which provided that the Supreme Exalted Ruler be the Chairman of the Board of Chancellors; that the Supreme Scribe was to be the secretary and recorder of all business transacted within its confines; that all meetings were to be held in secrecy; that Chancellors would be permitted twelve-minute speeches on any subject and only with the consent of the majority of the members would permission be given to a Chancellor to exceed this limit.

In the course of these meetings several types of important legislation were effected. First, the Board created a new status of activity, that of life-membership to be granted to all members of the newly formed Alumni Club. Second, it was during this period that Sigma Alpha Rho spread further with chapters in Jersey City (Zeta Omega), Overbrook (Zeta Iota) and Roxborough (Zeta Xi).

The problem of finances was placed in the capable hands of Brothers Rosenthal, Cantor and Wallner, who were able to liquidate the debts of the fraternity through the timely and fortunate contributions of the Phi and Omega Chapters.

The following year, Brothers Rosenthal, Cantor, Adlin were elected Chancellors. The Board this year was confronted with great financial difficulties. The Fraternity had suffered severe financial reversals in the last convention, and every available source of income was stretched to the breaking point in order to liquidate the outstanding obligations. However, the year that followed was characterized by many hopeful signs, such as financial recuperation, fraternal consolidation and conservative expansion. In 1928, an auditing committee was appointed to inspect the accounts of the fraternity. Furthermore, it became mandatory that the records of Sigma Alpha Rho be held open to all brothers at all times. Another rule passed this year provided that all chapters which failed to pay their per capita tax would be excluded from representation in the National Executive Councils.

District Councils

Philadelphia District Council
When on January 20, 1924, the Supreme Exalted Ruler dissolved the Executive Council and replaced it with a new National Executive Council, it became necessary to organize a local body which would combine the numerous Chapters in and around Philadelphia. For this reason, the Executive Council of Philadelphia District was inaugurated, with much the same makeup as the Executive Council, which had recently been dissolved.

The first Exalted Ruler (President) of the Philadelphia District Council was Walter Greenspan Horowitz. Martin Kremer succeeded Horowitz as Exalted Ruler and continued to band the Philadelphia Chapters together . Kremer was succeeded by Maurice Pollen of the Phi Chapter, and who left the position of Exalted Ruler to become Supreme Exalted Ruler the next year. Brother Pollen was succeeded by Albert Borish of the Theta chapter. He in turn was succeeded by Brother Benjamin Solomon of the Omega Chapter.

Metropolitan District Council
Following the adoption of the newly revised Constitution by the National Executive Council in Atlantic City in August 1924, the Metropolitan District Council, comprising the Chapters in New York City, Brooklyn, Jersey City, and Newark, New Jersey, was established. This council had for its purpose the blending together of the component parts of Sigma Alpha Rho that had been established in the New York City area. Henry Witner of the Mu Chapter was elected as the first Exalted Ruler. He was succeeded by N. Joseph Ross, also of the Mu Chapter. Brothers Lee J. Graff of the Zeta Eta Chapter and Louis Caminsky of Zeta Omega Chapter were elected for the ensuing terms.

Western Pennsylvania District Council
In 1925, the Western Pennsylvania District Council was organized consisting of Tau Chapter and the newly created Zeta Phi Chapter, both in the Pittsburgh area. Arnold Weinberg of the Tau Chapter was the first to be elected to the position of Exalted Ruler of the council.

Other District Councils
Other councils in the fraternity include the Metropolitan District council (Inaugurated in 1925 to represent the area of greater New York City), the Mid-Southern District Council  (Inaugurated in 1935 to represent Baltimore-Washington Metropolitan Area), the Southern District Council (Inaugurated 1938), the Central Pennsylvania District Council (Inaugurated in 1939), the Eastern District Council (Inaugurated in 1946 representing chapters in the southern parts of New Jersey), the Long Island District Council (Inaugurated 1958–1959), the Los Angeles District Council (Inaugurated 1960–1961), the Queens District Council (Inaugurated 1961), the Quebec Canadian District Council (Inaugurated 1966), the Boston District Council (Inaugurated 1966), and the Toronto District Council.

1930–1945
SAR brothers struggled through the great depression, but the fraternity survived.  Between 1929, when the Theta Theta chapter of New Orleans was inducted, and 1938, the fraternity began the practice of a winter, or midyear, meeting of chapter presidents, published the first edition of its hand book, and introduced three new district councils.

As World War II began in 1939, many brothers left for war, stretching the fraternity thin as even its president, Irving Rathblott, was called to war where he eventually died as a prisoner.  In 1943 the fraternity donated two ambulances to the U.S. Medical Corps, and, in 1945, SAR dedicated a war memorial in Fairmount Park in Philadelphia.  Also in 1945 over 30 different chapters were represented at the National Convention which began just three days after the armistice with Japan.

1946–1958
In 1946 SAR made many advances following over 800 brothers attending the convention that year.  The first Royal Purple and White yearbook was published, a national scholarship fund was established and named after Irving Rathblott, the Eastern District Council emerged, and SAR joined the Inter-fraternity Congress of America.

From 1950 to 1953 under the leadership of Leon Linder, SAR emphasized community service.  Such contributions were exemplified by large donations to The Polio Foundation, the National Society for Crippled Children and the Zeta Theta chapter of Wilkes-Barre, Pennsylvania assisting with construction of a new Jewish Community Center.

In the later 1950s, SAR adopted a fraternity flag while also expanding athletic competition and publishing the first Pledge training manual.  Also in this period, the past Supreme Exalted Ruler (President) of SAR, Howard L. Feldman, was elected president of the Inter-Fraternity Congress.

1958–1970
At the 1958 Convention, Charles Jay Bogdanoff was elected Supreme Exalted Ruler.  Bogdanoff led SAR to great expansion while also instituting a completely standardized training program.

During this period SAR reached a time of international brotherhood as trips were made across the country from Philadelphia to New Orleans to California and to the newest chapters in Montreal and Toronto.  Also, the fraternity printed numerous new publications including the Parents Guide and a film about the fraternity's history produced and directed by Allan Yasnyi.

1970–1985
In the 1970s and early 1980s, a leadership training program was introduced as the winter conclave evolved into a full fraternity Midyear convention.  With the second convention, the sites could now expand as Ocean City, Maryland, and Virginia Beach, Virginia, became regular hosts.  The national board also added large ski trips and Bowling events to the national agenda.  Interstate Chapter travel proliferated.

1985–1997
During the late 1980s and early to mid-1990s, the fraternity began to elect more and more multi-term SERs (presidents).  Larry Blumenthal served from 1985 to 1988 and again from 1992 to 1993, Stuart Discount returned for his fourth term as SER, and Marty Hyatt (1965–2009) and Rob Malumud served 2 terms each in the period.  All of these leaders used their extra time in office to develop their successors and grow the fraternity.

The period was exemplified by the annual bowling parties and growth in the active chapters around the entire fraternity.

1997–Present
As the new century was about to begin, many future leaders developed from 1997 to 1999 when Sigma Alpha Rho was led by Adam Goldstein, the 60th SER. Sigma Alpha Rho became the elite organization for Jewish boys to join in order to become men.  From Roller hockey leagues, to dances, from Preakness weekends to leadership seminars, Sigma Alpha Rho saw its young leaders step into larger roles due to Goldstein's pioneering fraternal spirit and insistence on chapter activity.

In 1999, the fraternity reins were handed over to Michael Mendelson, the millennium's first Supreme Exalted Ruler.  SER Mendelson provided focus to a prospering fraternity.  From 1999 to 2002 Sigma Alpha Rho saw dramatic growth.

A veteran board member of both SER Goldstein and SER Mendelson, was Jason Eric Saylor, who continued the tradition of hard work and fraternal dedication upon his election as Supreme Exalted Ruler in 2002.  During Saylor's terms as SER, he became the "traveling SER", going from meeting to meeting and council to council to hold face-to-face meetings with future leaders, ensuring growth and activity continued with enthusiasm and great fraternal pride.

Young leaders continued to emerge as the first half of the decade ended. Sigma Alpha Rho saw Eric Matisoff, who was one of the leading figures in Sigma Alpha Rho's growth in Central New Jersey take over to run Sigma Alpha Rho as Supreme Exalted Ruler in 2004.

True to his reputation as one of the Current Generation's most dedicated brothers, Brother Saylor returned to the top post in Sigma Alpha Rho in 2005 and continued in that role up to the election of Matt Bagell as SER on June 20, 2007.

Perhaps the evolution of this era is best dramatized by the remarkable growth in suburban Philadelphia, Central New Jersey, Northern New Jersey, Baltimore, Maryland, and Washington, D.C. Communications also changed dramatically, from the classic monthly letter from the SER to the newly born SAR website and, ultimately, to mass E-mail. Training moved from pep talks at meetings to leadership seminars and retreats and interactive personal strategies initiated by home-grown motivational experts.

Past Supreme Exalted Rulers Charles Bogdanoff, Carl Bagell, Stuart Discount, Larry Blumenthal, and Robert Malmud continue to serve the fraternity on a daily basis as "Active PSERs." The assistance, mentoring, and time these men have put into the active fraternity has been priceless.

Over the last decade many traditions have been altered. Midyear Convention has grown in size and scope, often attracting two and three times the attendance of the Summer Convention. Creative event presentation was coupled with targeted chapter problem solving, added to the social, athletic and religious agendas. Chapter and Pledge Manuals were updated to guarantee chapters' ability to run themselves. Fraternity travel grew not just in size but also in scope, as Convention Sites such as Toronto were added to the list, and Rathblott scholarships have grown in size and number thanks to the great effort by PSER Nathan Strauss

The Chapters
A chapter is a group of brothers organized by geographical area.  Chapters form the basis for all SAR activity. Chapters have names of one or two Greek letters based on their date of charter (see table below). The brothers in each chapter elect officers and organize events at regular meetings as well as receiving reports on the progress of committees and of other chapters.  Chapter officers include the following: Sigma Rho (President), Mu Rho (Vice-President), Kappa Mu (Treasurer), Kappa Beta (Secretary) in descending rank order.  Chapters may elect, or have their Sigma Rho appoint, other positions including brothers to be in charge of phone calls, specific events, community service, fundraisers, the chapter newspaper and parent affairs (meetings between the parents of the brothers and active alumni or supreme board members), and always have a brother appointed to run their pledge classes known as the Rho chairman.

Chapter List
	

Note: Chapter development from first to eleventh have a specific name pattern: the 'f' sound in 'first' was used to build the name Phi. The 's' sound in 'second' was used to build the name for Sigma. The 'th' sound in 'third' was used to build the name Theta. Since one already used the 'f' sound for Phi, one moves to the next letter in the word, 'fourth' meaning that the second letter of 'o' was used to build the chapter name of Omega. Similarly, the 'f' sound in fifth was used for Phi, so the next letter of 'i' in 'fifth' was used for Iota.

Again, the 's' sound had already been utilized for the creation of the Sigma name, and the next letter 'i' for 'six' was also used in Iota's name. In this case, the 'x' would be used to build the name of Xi for the sixth chapter. When it came to the seventh chapter, the same principle holds true with 's' already used in Sigma and 'e' thereby used to create Epsilon. The names of the chapters were thus built upon the sounds of the word for first, second, third, fourth, fifth, sixth, seventh, eighth, ninth, tenth, and eleventh for the first 11 chapters. Therefore, the sound for eighth became the Eta Chapter as eighth sounded similar for the Greek Letter Eta. Ninth became Nu, Tenth became Tau, and Eleventh became Lambda as the e had previously been used for Epsilon and the next letter L was used instead.

Early Chapter Histories

Phi Chapter
With the constitution of the Sigma Chapter, the Phi Chapter now became merely a constituent part of the Fraternity itself. The older members of the Chapter, in the habit of deciding controlling features of the Fraternity, were rebellious at being subordinated to mere control of their individual Chapter. Gradually, however, the Phi Chapter assumed its proper place in the firmament of our organization.

At the elections which had been held prior to the induction of the Sigma Chapter, Leon S. Rosenthal had been elected as Sacred Ruler, that being the new title of the presiding officer as provided by the revised rituals.

Throughout the year, which was one of readjustment for the Phi Chapter, great progress was made, and, at the following elections, Benson Schambelin was elected as Sacred Ruler. Schambelin was followed in due order as Sacred Ruler by Morris Foxman, Martin Kremer, Maurice Pollen, Leonard Barrol, Dave Foxman, and Melvin Feldscher. Throughout all these administrations, the Phi Chapter kept growing in prestige and in activity. Meanwhile, a great part of its members contributed to the advancement of the Fraternity on the national level.

Currently, the Phi chapter consists of brothers from Lower Moreland High School. The president is Moshe Adika.

Sigma Chapter
The ten charter men formed the basis of one of the leading chapters of the Fraternity—Sigma, a chapter that has contributed a great number of men to the National Organization, having furnished a host of Supreme Exalted Rulers and other National Officers. On organizing, the ten charter members elected as their Sacred Ruler, Walter Greenspan Horowitz, who had been the backbone of the organization of that Chapter. Horowitz, because of his natural sagacity and shrewdness, enabled the Chapter to survive many problems during its first few years. He was reelected for a second term before he was succeeded by Samuel Sherman Good, who also served two terms. Following Brother Good's administration were elected in succession Benjamin Horowitz for two terms; Allen Adlin, Maurice Schneiman, Joseph Grossman, and Isadore Baskin.

Sigma provided for the creation of a national improvement committee, which was to be composed of a national head who would appoint one man in each district as a member of this active committee. In addition, a new committee was created for the chapter, which was known as the Inter Chapter Relations Committee, whose purpose was to strengthen the ties with other chapters.

Sigma – the Social Chapter – with the motto, "Every active man active" had a banquet on June 10, 1931, commemorating its tenth year of active life.

Theta Chapter
On October 17, 1921, the Theta Chapter in South Philadelphia High School was inducted at the Lorraine Hotel as the third chapter of Sigma Alpha Rho. Concurrently with the negotiations for the induction of the Sigma Chapter, a group in the South Philadelphia had been making plans to join the SAR. They selected as their first Sacred Ruler, Emil Francis Goldhaber, who was later to make a great name for himself in the development of the Fraternity. Brother Goldhaber held this position for several terms and was succeeded by Nathan L. Edelstein, who in turn was succeeded by Louis Sherr, Herman Krakowitz, Meyer Heiman, Martin Berger, Jack Yanoff (2 terms), and Maurice Morton.

Omega Chapter
January 8, 1922, marked the induction of the Omega Chapter of the Northeast High School.  This group elected as their first Sacred Ruler, Joseph Levitt. Brother Levitt was succeeded by Joseph Brandschain, who was re-elected three times. It was only after Brother Brandschain refused further re-election that Henry Weiss was elected as Sacred Ruler. He was followed in due order by Solis Stanford Cantor, Joseph Getzow, Richard Miller, Benjamin Solomon, and Jules Margolis.

Currently, the Omega chapter consists of brothers from Northeast, Central, and Washington High schools and the president is Brandon Chudnoff.

Iota Chapter
On November 26, 1922, the first distant chapter was inducted. The Iota chapter of Chester High School (Pennsylvania) was given the rituals at the Majestic Hotel. For a time, Iota had an unwritten law that only twelve new members be admitted each year in honor of the twelve Charter members.

The first brothers to hold office in this Chapter were: Sigma Rho, Abe Good; Mu Rho, Herman Bloom; Kappa Beta, Leon Blumberg; Kappa Mu, Charles Winn; and Kappa Alpha, Harold Brody.

In the early days of the Chapter, the meetings were devoted primarily to fraternalism and good fellowship, but as the time wore on the Chapter tended toward the social side of the fraternity.

Xi Chapter
The Xi chapter of Germantown High School (Philadelphia) was inducted on November 26, 1922, at the same time as the Iota Chapter. Adolph Kissileff was the first Sacred Ruler and leading spirit of Xi Chapter. He was followed in due order by Jack Cohen, Jules Sokoloff, George Goldner, Charles Howard White, and Frank Neufeld.

The Xi Chapter became extremely active under the very able guidance of Sigma Rho Harold Catsiff.

Epsilon Chapter
Another out-of-town chapter was inducted in Camden, New Jersey, on October 12, 1923. This was known as the Epsilon chapter of Camden High School. With this event, SAR became a national body, with the first chapter inducted outside of Pennsylvania. The first Sacred Ruler of the Epsilon Chapter was Carl Auerbach, and among those who succeeded him were Norman Heine, George Tartar, Samuel Cohen and Sylvan Grass.

Eta Chapter
On the same occasion, the Eta chapter of Frankford High School of Philadelphia was born. Their first Sacred Ruler was Albert Schaeffer, who was succeeded by Abraham Lipson, Charles Zeitman, Joseph Weinfeld, Sylvester Shaffer, Philip Douglas and Raymond Stevens.

Eta Omega Chapter
In the Winter of 1975, Cherry Hill New Jersey had five chapters.  Three chapters drew their members mostly from the East Side.  Two chapters drew their members from the West Side.  All chapters met at the Jewish Community Center (at the time located on Route 70 next to Bishop Eustace,) on Tuesday nights to plan weekend activities.

Due to an unfortunate series of circumstances, Epsilon Chapters brother old enough to have drivers licenses were located on the West Side of town.  Younger non-drivers were located mostly on the East side of town.  The brothers on the West side of town found it inconvenient to drive the Eastside kids to and from events and often did not.

Feeling angry and isolated after missing multiple social events, some members of Epsilon seceded and formed their own Eta Omega chapter.  The founding members included brothers Bruce Zamost (President), Bill Kaiser (Treasurer), Leon Roomberg (secretary and parliamentarian), Allen Taylor (Vice President), and Gary Weigner.  Lee Bittman, Robert Roomberg, and Bill Ellman were inducted shortly thereafter.

The Jewish Community Center staff found Danny Glanz, a middle-age SAR brother to serve as the chapter's adult advisor.

Leon Roomberg was the first to obtain a drivers licenses and the chapter then engaged in twice-monthly road trips.  Most trips were to existing chapters in South Philadelphia, Center Philadelphia, Cheltenham, and the Philadelphia's Great North East and then Warminster.  The chapter then started monthly trips to befriend struggling chapters in Atlantic City and Baltimore.

The chapter lasted several more years before the general decline in recruitment occurred. At one point Eta Omega stopped recruiting new pledges, directing prospects to Beta Tau (East Side) and/or Epsilon (East Side and West side).  [Need confirmation of this rumor.]

Then, in the fall of 1985, a new group of about 20 pledges from Cherry Hill was inducted into Eta Omega through the efforts of Brothers Steven Wernick and Drew Denker.  This Eta Omega chapter (1985–89) won consecutive awards for Best New Chapter and Most Improved Chapter, and some of its members (Derek Braslow and Drew Katz) joined the ranks of the regional and national board.  This chapter remained strong through the high school years up until 1989.  Members of this newly formed Eta Omega chapter included brothers Derek Braslow (President 1985–1987), Bart Goldstein (President 1987–1988), Drew Katz, Jason Melemed, Alan Zapp (Treasurer), Darren Fleishman, Scott Angstreich, Todd Beresin, Andrew Shapiro, Jeff Segal, Todd Schoenhaus (President 1988–1989), Jason Ravitz, Scott Shuster, Mike Lieberman,  Mike Fox, Matt Markoff, and Josh Mintz, among others.

Today, Eta Omega exists only to the extent its alumni maintain connections and commitments to each other.

Source: www.roomberg.com/base/http://www.roomberg.com/family/093.SAR.v.001.dir/index.html

Nu-Beta Chapter
November 30, 1923, saw the entrance of the Nu Chapter of the Newark, New Jersey High School into the Fraternity. It was the first chapter many miles from the seat of the National activities. Their first Sacred Ruler was N. Joseph Ross, who later became a significant figure in the National organization, and who was the first brother outside of Philadelphia to obtain national prominence in the fraternity. Brother Ross was succeeded by Fred Sweibel, Brother Targer, Jerry Marcus, Louis Menk and Brother Weinrob.

In 1925, the Nu Chapter merged with the Beta Chapter to form the Nu-Beta Chapter. The second anniversary banquet was held June 17, 1926, at the Elks Club, Newark.

In September of the same year, elections for officers were held and David Meyer was elected Sigma Rho.

In November 1928, Nu Beta absorbed the Theta Beta Rho Fraternity.

The Chapter was led by Arnold Eisen, Ira Weinman, Jerome Marcus and Seymore Zeitlan.

Tau Chapter
December 26, 1923, heralded the oncoming of the Tau Chapter in Pittsburgh, Pennsylvania. This Chapter was inducted at a still greater distance from where the fraternity had originally started. This Chapter being far from the center of the fraternal activity was nonetheless enthusiastic in the conduct of their fraternal development. The first Sacred Ruler was Arnold Weinberg who was followed by Walter Adler, Brother Marcus and others equally as energetic.

Lambda Chapter
On February 10, 1924, the Lambda Chapter was inaugurated in Wilmington, Delaware.

Zeta Chapter
The induction ceremony of Zeta chapter of Binghamton, New York, was held February 22, 1924. Nine men were given the ritual. An induction banquet was held February 26, 1924.

Zeta started with nine men. They quickly reached 31 associate members, 13 active, and several pledges. They were quickly successful with social activities. They had a reputation for fine fellowship that made them the most outstanding fraternity at the high school, Jewish and American alike. Matthew Savitch, the first Sigma Rho was followed by Sydney Gartel and others who were equally as prominent in chapter affairs.

Rho and Upsilon Chapters
The Rho Chapter came into the Sigma Alpha Rho Fraternity on April 2, 1924, thus adding to the list that of Allentown, Pennsylvania. The first Sacred Ruler of the Rho Chapter was Abraham Grossman. Several days later, the Upsilon Chapter, covering Greater New York City, was taken in April 13, 1924.

Mu and Kappa Chapters
Due to the increased desire of men to become brothers of the Sigma Alpha Rho Fraternity, it was necessary to form additional chapters to fill in the new brothers. Thus, it came about that the Mu and Kappa Chapters of New York City was installed on May 25, 1924. The first Sacred Ruler of the Mu Chapter was Henry Wittner, who was followed by such men as Leon Rosenzweig, Gabriel Rosenheck, Morton Palitz.

Zeta Phi Chapter
The year of 1925 marked the birth of Sigma Alpha Rho's 21st Chapter, Zeta Phi in Pittsburgh, Pennsylvania. It had its origin in a social group of Jewish boys at Allegheny High School known as Sera Lugnis. This group was formally inducted as a chapter on April 30, 1925, at the Fort Pitt Hotel.

Zeta Phi's first social season included a Fall Invitational Dance followed by a New Year's Party and later by a Senior Play Dance conducted by the Inter-Fraternity Council of Allegheny High School. This year marked the formation of the Council at Allegheny. Zeta Phi, the only Jewish fraternity represented, was a foremost factor in the council. Later followed the I.F.C. Commencement Dance at Schenly Hotel. In this year, Zeta Phi was actively represented in the sport field with a first rate basketball team.

Zeta Phi succeeded in furnishing two brothers to the National body, Brothers Framer and Sallen, both of whom were National Organizers of merit.

Zeta Omega Chapter
The Zeta Omega chapter of Jersey City, New Jersey, was inducted on September 26, 1926. The charter members were Lou Caminsky, "Hank" Markowitz, Paul Heyman, Harry Goldenberg, Hal Edelman, who later transferred to the Mu Chapter; Jimmy Mergentime, who also transferred to the Upsilon Chapter; Sam Turkus, later transferred to the Beta Chapter, and Abe Golden, honorary member.

Zeta Iota Chapter
When the new Overbrook High School in Philadelphia, was opened, SAR, after considerable effort, inducted the Zeta Iota Chapter there on November 28, 1926.

Zeta Xi Chapter
The Zeta Xi Chapter, of Roxborough High School in the Roxborough neighborhood of Philadelphia, was given the ritual on March 7, 1927.

Zeta Epsilon and Zeta Eta Chapters
The Metropolitan (New York City) district was in need of more chapters so the Zeta Epsilon and Zeta Eta Chapters were inducted in November 1927.

Zeta Nu and Zeta Tau Chapters
In November 1927, the Zeta Nu Chapter in Passaic, New Jersey, was formally inducted. The opening of the Simon Gratz High School in Philadelphia saw the creation of the Zeta Tau Chapter, which inducted on March 25, 1928.

Zeta Lambda and Theta Sigma Chapters
In December 1928, the Zeta Lambda Chapter was inducted in McKeesport, Pennsylvania.

In January, 1929, the Theta Sigma Chapter was given the ritual in Buffalo, New York.

Theta Theta Chapter
The Theta Theta Chapter was organized in 1929 and was situated in New Orleans. Brother Benjamin Horowitz traveled to give the new men the ritual. On January 4, an Inaugural Dance, a very successful affair, was held. Their first officer was Romeo Zacharay, Sigma Rho.

National Publications
Nelson T. Hoffman Memorial Blue Book – Fraternity's roster book
The Royal Purple & White Yearbook
The Gleaming Eye – The national newspaper – Current editor is Max Smith--Click Here for Midyear Convention 2008 Edition
Other publications are produced for specific occasions such as "The Order: Sigma Alpha Rho 2002–2007," which was published for the 90th anniversary alumni reunion on May 20, 2007.--Click Here

Origins of National Publications
From 1931 History of SAR
Such a sudden multiplication of chapters necessitated the creation of some means with which to communicate with them. Hence, the Gleaming Eye, the fraternity's newspaper, was created.

Originally, the Gleaming Eye was merely one of the routine matters of the Publicity Department, so that the Editor-in-Chief is also known as the National Publican. In 1924, Supreme Exalted Ruler Rosenthal presented to a meeting of the Executive Council the plans and specifications for the establishment of a fraternity paper, to be called the Gleaming Eye. The first editor was selected, as Harry M. Buten of the Sigma Chapter. Under the guidance of Buten, the paper made a very promising debut and continued to make frequent appearances for two years.

The following year with Brother Sam Good as the newly selected Editor, the magazine indeed reached auspicious heights for it appeared first as an eight-page and then as a thirty-two page issue for the Convention of that year. However, because the regime closed with a considerable deficit, while the fraternity was fighting for its existence, the Gleaming Eye at the same time was almost washed under due to these financial woes. Hence, Brother Adlin, the 1927 Editor, was enabled to publish only one issue.

Over the course of 1928 and 1929, David Kaliner of Phi chapter, who was National Publican, published seven issues. In 1930, Brother Joseph Pinkenson was appointed National Publican, and he published four issues of the Gleaming Eye. Stress was laid upon national news and for the first time chapter articles were discontinued. In 1931 Brother Pinkenson was again selected as Editor and five issues, the largest number in any one year, were published. The circulation of the magazine was improved, and for the first time in the history of the fraternity, the Gleaming Eye was published without the aid of the Board of Chancellors. Financial means were secured through advertisements. Thus, the Gleaming Eye had grown from a small paper to a regularly issued magazine.

Conventions
SAR runs semi-annual conventions (One in winter known as Midyear and the other at some point over the summer) when the entire organization spends a weekend together and enjoys numerous events as well as conducting legislative business. Past convention locations include: New York City, New York; Toronto, Ontario, Canada; Ocean City, Maryland; Seaside Heights, New Jersey; Baltimore, Maryland; Long Island, New York; Washington, D.C.; Stamford, Connecticut; Pocono Mountains, Pennsylvania; Atlantic City, New Jersey; Hershey, Pennsylvania; and Virginia Beach, Virginia.

Pledging
A pledge is any eligible male of high school (or spring of 8th grade) age who has decided that he would like to join the fraternity and been approved by the chapter. To be eligible he must be of age and consider himself Jewish. First, the person needs to contact a brother, be contacted by a brother, or come to a meeting for those interested in joining the fraternity ('Pitch meeting'). Contact information is available on the fraternity website for those interested in joining the fraternity. Sigma Alpha Rho's pledging process is designed to prepare the pledges to be completely active and equal members of the chapter from the day that they are inducted. SAR emphasizes a no hazing policy as during pledgeship pledges attend meetings and can participate in fraternity wide events, while also organizing their own. Pledges must complete certain tasks before inductions such as planning and executing a certain event such as a bus and tickets to a professional sporting event, preparing a pledge newspaper, or organizing informal sports with their own or another chapter.

Girls
Girls attend all events, including the Midyear and Summer Conventions, and may start sister girls groups to plan their own events and/or to plan to attend fraternity events. Girls groups generally meet less than the chapters and are organized as part of the Tau Epsilon Chi (TEX), Eta Pi, or Zeta Gamma Phi sororities. Girls who are interested in attending events, but who are not yet affiliated with an SAR chapter, Sorority chapter, or girls group, generally send their contact information to the local chapter or national fraternity via e-mail to the SER (see Supreme Exalted Ruler).

Governing Body
Also known by the acronym SBC, the Supreme Board of Chancellors is the overarching governing body of SAR at all times other than midyear or summer convention. During the meeting of all members of the fraternity at the Conventions, that body, known as the International Executive Council (IEC) serves as the highest body while in session. The SBC is elected by the brothers at the IEC meeting at each summer convention.

Current Board
The Current Supreme Board of Chancellors (Governing Board):

Supreme Exalted Ruler
Also known by the acronym 'SER', the Supreme Exalted Ruler is the president of Sigma Alpha Rho fraternity—more formally known as Pi Sigma Alpha Rho—and is elected to a one-year term, along with the rest of the Supreme Board of Chancellors at each summer convention.

Notable alumni
 Mike Belman – Former President Jewish Federation of Greater Philadelphia, Federation of Jewish Agencies
 Emil F. Goldhaber – Former Chief Bankruptcy Judge of the United States District Court for the Eastern District of Pennsylvania, Past President of Golden Slipper Club and Charities
 Tony Kornheiser ESPN television (Pardon the Interruption) and radio host
 Rabbi Mordechai Leibling – Former President of Jewish Reconstructionist Federation
 Scott Levin – 2 time Worth Top 100 Wealth Advisor
 Jerry Robins – Spokesman/Owner Robbins Diamonds
 Howard P. Rovner – Former President of Temple University's Fox School of Business, Former President of National Brith Sholom
 Bob Rovner – Former Pennsylvania State Senator and Philadelphia area Radio show host
 Stephen H. Silverman – Former Radio Host ("Law Talk" on WNPV)
 Ed Snider – Chairman of Philadelphia 76ers and Philadelphia Flyers
 Allan Yasnyi – Chairman Synapse Communications, Noted Producer, Member of Advisory Board for Florida Atlantic University's Desantis Center

See also 
List of Jewish fraternities and sororities

References

External links
Sigma Alpha Rho Fraternity International Official website

High school fraternities and sororities
Culture of Philadelphia
Jewish youth organizations
1917 establishments in Pennsylvania
Organizations based in Philadelphia
Jewish organizations based in the United States
Student organizations established in 1917
Fraternities and sororities in the United States
Fraternities and sororities in Canada
Historically Jewish fraternities in the United States
Jewish organizations established in 1917